Sarah Micklem is the author of the best-selling fantasy novel, Firethorn. She began writing after many years as a graphic designer and spent fourteen years working for Time Warner, designing for a children's magazine in New York City. She wrote Firethorn while working as the art director for the magazine. The second part of the trilogy is titled Wildfire. She is the second daughter of three children, of a schoolteacher father and an activist mother. She received her high school G.E.D and graduated from Princeton University. She lives with her husband, poet and playwright Cornelius Eady, in New York City and Indiana, where she teaches fiction at the University of Notre Dame.

Bibliography
Firethorn (2004)
Wildfire (2009)

References

External links
Sarah Micklem's official website
Writer Unboxed Interview in-depth interview with Sarah Micklem

21st-century American novelists
American women novelists
American fantasy writers
American graphic designers
Women graphic designers
Princeton University alumni
University of Notre Dame faculty
Living people
Women science fiction and fantasy writers
21st-century American women writers
Novelists from Indiana
Year of birth missing (living people)
American women academics